The Moorish viper (Daboia mauritanica or Macrovipera mauritanica; common names: Moorish viper, Sahara rock viper, Atlas blunt-nosed viper, more) is a venomous viper species found in northwestern Africa. No subspecies are currently recognized.

Description 

Reaches a maximum length of 180 cm.

Common names 
Moorish viper, Sahara rock viper, Atlas blunt-nosed viper, Atlas adder, mountain adder.

Geographic range 
Northwestern Africa: Morocco, Algeria and Tunisia. The type locality is "Algiers", according to Gray (1842), "Algeria" according to Schwarz (1936). Limited to the coastal regions of Algeria. Coastal records from Tunisia may refer to M. deserti.

Conservation status 
This species is classified as Near Threatened (NT) according to the IUCN Red List of Threatened Species (v3.1, 2001). Classified as such because this species is likely in significant decline (but at a rate of less than 30% over ten years) due to persecution, accidental mortality and over-harvesting, therefore making it close to qualifying for Vulnerable. The population trend is down. Year assessed: 2005.

Taxonomy 
Based on molecular evidence, Lenk et al. (2001) suggested that this species, along with M. deserti, should rather be included in the genus Daboia.

References

External links 

 
 . Accessed 9 September 2007.

Daboia
Snakes of Africa
Reptiles of North Africa
Reptiles described in 1848
Taxa named by Gabriel Bibron
Taxa named by André Marie Constant Duméril